is a city located in Aomori Prefecture, Japan. , the city had an estimated population of 51,578 in 25,615 households, and a population density of 130 persons per km2.

Geography
Goshogawara occupies two discontinuous areas on Tsugaru Peninsula in western Aomori Prefecture. The Iwaki River flows through the city. The larger section is landlocked, and is in the middle of the peninsula. It contains the original town of Goshogawara, and is the population centre of the city. The smaller exclave to the north is on the Sea of Japan coast. Parts of the city are within the borders of the Tsugaru Quasi-National Park.

Neighbouring municipalities
Aomori Prefecture
Aomori
Tsugaru
Itayanagi
Tsuruta
Nakadomari
Imabetsu
Sotogahama
Yomogita

Climate
The city has a cold humid continental climate (Köppen Cfb) characterized by warm short summers and long cold winters with heavy snowfall. The average annual temperature in Goshogawara is 10.6 °C. The average annual rainfall is 1281 mm with September as the wettest month. The temperatures are highest on average in August, at around 23.4 °C, and lowest in January, at around -1.5 °C.

Demographics
Per Japanese census data, the population of Goshogawara has declined over the past 40 years.

History
The area of Goshogawara was part of the holdings of the Tsugaru clan of Hirosaki Domain in the Edo period. With the post-Meiji restoration establishment of the modern municipalities system on April 1, 1889, the area became part of Kitatsugaru District, Aomori, and was divided into the villages of Goshogawara, Sakae, Miyoshi, Nakagawa, Nagahashi, Nanawa, Matsushima and Itayanagi on April 1, 1889. On July 1, 1898, Goshogawara was elevated to town status. On October 1, 1954. Goshogawara absorbed the villages of Sakae, Nakagawa, Nagahashi, Matsushima and Iizume to create the city of Goshogawara. On April 1, 1958, Goshogawara absorbed a portion of the town of Kizukuri.

On March 28, 2005, the town of Kanagi, and the village of Shiura were merged into Goshogawara.

Government
Goshogawara has a mayor-council form of government with a directly elected mayor and a unicameral city legislature of 26 members. Goshogawara, together with the town of Nakadomari contribute three members to the Aomori Prefectural Assembly. In terms of national politics, the city is part of Aomori 3rd district of the lower house of the Diet of Japan.

Economy
The economy of Goshogawara is mixed. The city serves as a regional commercial center. Agricultural produce includes rice and apples, and commercial fishing includes clams. The Aomori Technopolis High-Tech Industrial Park is located in the city.

Education
Goshogawara has 11 public elementary schools and six public junior high schools operated by the city government. The city has five public high schools operated by the Aomori prefectural Board of Education. The city also has two private high schools.

High schools
Prefectural
Goshogawara High School
Goshogawara Technical High School
Goshogawara Agriculture and Forestry High School
Kanagi High School

Private
Goshogawara Daiichi High School
Goshogawara Commercial High School

Transportation

Railway
 East Japan Railway Company (JR East) - Gonō Line
 
 Tsugaru Railway 
 -  -  -  -  -  -  -  -

Highway
  Tsugaru Expressway

Local attractions

Tachineputa Museum - Goshogawara is famous for its Tachineputa Festival, held annually from August 4 to August 8. The tachineputa floats are much taller than their counterparts in Aomori and Hirosaki, reaching heights of up to 23 meters. 
Osamu Dazai Memorial Museum
Lake Jūsan
Ashino Chishōgun Prefectural Natural Park
Goshogawara Sue Pottery Kiln Site, a National Historic Site
Sannobō Site, a National Historic Site
Tosaminato ruins, a National Historic Site

Noted people from Goshogawara
Osamu Dazai, novelist
Bunji Tsushima, politician
Ikuzo Yoshi, Enka singer-songwriter
Shimizugawa Motokichi, sumo wrestler
Kashiwado Risuke, sumo wrestler
Kōji Hirayama, politician
Daichi Shimoyama, basketball player

References

External links

 

 
Cities in Aomori Prefecture
Populated coastal places in Japan